Emma Hamilton is a 1968 historical drama film directed by Christian-Jaque and starring Michèle Mercier, Richard Johnson and John Mills. It was partly based on the 1864 novel La Sanfelice by Alexandre Dumas and depicts the love affair between Emma Hamilton and Horatio Nelson. It was a co-production between Italy, West Germany, France and the United States.

Cast
 Michèle Mercier as Emma Lyon-Hamilton
 Richard Johnson as Horatio Nelson
 John Mills as Sir William Hamilton
 Harald Leipnitz as Harry Featherstone
 Claudio Undari as Captain Hardy
 Mirko Ellis as John Payne
 Lorenzo Terzon as Lord Charles Greville
 Howard Ross as Dick Strong
 Gabriella Giorgelli as Laurie Strong
 Gisela Uhlen as Mrs Love
 Venantino Venantini as Prince Carraciola
 Mario Pisu as King Ferdinand of Naples
 Boy Gobert as Romney, George
 Gigi Ballista as Cardinal Ruffo
 Dieter Borsche as Dr. Graham
 Nadja Tiller as Queen Caroline of Naples

See also
List of American films of 1968

References

External links

1968 films
West German films
English-language French films
English-language German films
English-language Italian films
1960s biographical drama films
1968 romantic drama films
Films based on French novels
Films based on historical novels
Films based on works by Alexandre Dumas
Films directed by Christian-Jaque
Films set in Naples
Films set in the 1790s
Films set in the 1800s
American romantic drama films
American biographical drama films
French romantic drama films
French biographical drama films
German biographical drama films
Italian romantic drama films
Italian biographical drama films
1960s historical romance films
Cultural depictions of Horatio Nelson
Cultural depictions of Emma, Lady Hamilton
Italian historical romance films
American historical romance films
French historical romance films
Gaumont Film Company films
Constantin Film films
1960s English-language films
1960s American films
1960s Italian films
1960s French films
1960s German films